Myrsine diazii is a species of plant in the family Primulaceae. It is endemic to Peru.

References

Trees of Peru
Endemic flora of Peru
diazii
Vulnerable plants
Taxonomy articles created by Polbot